The 1985–86 Louisville Cardinals men's basketball team represented the University of Louisville during the 1985–86 NCAA Division I men's basketball season, Louisville's 72nd season of intercollegiate competition. The Cardinals competed in the Metro Conference and were coached by Denny Crum. The team played home games at Freedom Hall.

The team compiled a 32–7 record and brought Louisville basketball their second NCAA national championship when they defeated Duke, 72–69.

Roster

Schedule and results

|-
!colspan=9 style=| Regular Season

|-
!colspan=9 style=| Metro Conference tournament

|-
!colspan=9 style=| NCAA Tournament

NCAA basketball tournament

West region

Final Four

Awards and honors
 Billy Thompson, first team All-Metro Conference
 Billy Thompson, AP honorable mention All-American
 Billy Thompson, NCAA All-Tournament team
 Billy Thompson, NCAA All-West regional
 Milt Wagner, first team All-Metro Conference
 Milt Wagner. AP honorable mention All-American
 Pervis Ellison, Final Four Most Outstanding Player
 Pervis Ellison, NCAA All-West regional
 Pervis Ellison, Metro Conference Freshman of the Year
 Pervis Ellison, second team All-Metro Conference
 Herbert Crook, NCAA All-West regional
 Tony Kimbro, Metro Conference All-Freshman team

Team players drafted into the NBA

References

Louisville Cardinals
Louisville Cardinals men's basketball seasons
NCAA Division I men's basketball tournament championship seasons
NCAA Division I men's basketball tournament Final Four seasons
Louisville
Louisville Cardinals men's basketball, 1985-86
Louisville Cardinals men's basketball, 1985-86